Islas de Santa Fe National Park is a national park of Argentina. It is situated in San Jerónimo Department,  Santa Fe, Argentina.It was established in 2010.

References

National parks of Argentina
Protected areas established in 2010
Biosphere reserves of Argentina